The A. T. Averill House is a historic building located in Cedar Rapids, Iowa, United States.  Local architects Sidney Smith and W.A. Fulkerson designed this 2-story, brick Late Victorian home.  It was completed in 1886 for farm implement dealer Arthur Tappan Averill.  This is a more restrained version of the High Victorian style.  The house features a truncated hip roof, a 2-story polygonal bay, and a rectangular tower set on the diagonal.  The carriage house/barn behind the house is of a similar design, but older.  The house was listed on the National Register of Historic Places in 1978.

References

Houses completed in 1886
Victorian architecture in Iowa
Houses in Cedar Rapids, Iowa
National Register of Historic Places in Cedar Rapids, Iowa
Houses on the National Register of Historic Places in Iowa